Anthony Dang Mingyan (born 12 July 1967) is a Chinese Catholic priest and Archbishop of the  Roman Catholic Archdiocese of Xi'an since 2006.

Biography
Dang was born as the eighth of nine children in a Catholic family in Getiao Township of Shanyang County, Shaanxi, China, on July 12, 1967. He began a priesthood seminar in Xi'an, Shaanxi in 1985 but continued his theological education at the Sheshan Seminary in Shanghai. He was ordained a priest in 1991. From 1991 to 1996 he taught at Shaanxi Provincial Seminary. In 2002 he was accepted to Shaanxi Normal University, majoring in psychology, where he graduated in 2004. Prior to his diocese, he was the parish priest of St. Antony's Church, four kilometers west of the St. Francis Cathedral of Xi'an, since it opened in 2003. He became auxiliary bishop of Xi'an on July 26, 2005, which was recognized by the Pope. On July 5, 2006, he became Archbishop of the Roman Catholic Archdiocese of Xi'an.

References

External links

1967 births
Living people
21st-century Roman Catholic archbishops in China
Shaanxi Normal University alumni
People from Shanyang County
Chinese Roman Catholic archbishops